Atari Blitzkrieg, is a Virginia based American hip hop artist. He is known for his heavy use of alliteration, multi-syllabic rhyming schemes and incorporation of various genres into his music.

A review on Music Zeitgeist states, "Atari Blitzkrieg is not a noise-core post-electro-clash/Blade Runner tributary. Evoking something more along the lines of Jedi Mind Tricks sharing kind with Common and maybe even MC. 900 Ft. Jesus, Atari Blitzkrieg is ready to drop a fat collection of eloquence and Cheshire Cat propensity on the sleepy indie music world."

History 

Chris Moore was exposed to a wide range of musical genres at an early age. He began experimenting with music as a cellist in elementary school. This led to acquiring a thrift store turntable at 12, a drum machine at 14 and a microphone at 15. Atari (as Krohme) would then create his first recorded songs in 1995. His first on-record appearance as Atari wasn't until 2006 with a few appearances on Krohme's The Beasts Released: South of Heaven Volume 1, which led to 2007's Rokkonorrottenhell single, featuring Royce Da 5'9, Groovie Mann from the industrial band My Life with the Thrill Kill Kult and producer Krohme.

Since then, he has been nominated as an URB Next 1000, released close to 400 songs, unveiled 25 EPs, 3 full-length albums, dozens of guest appearances while working with some of the biggest names in music; Speech of Arrested Development, The Game, Sid Wilson, Lord Jamar, Daedelus, Rapper Pooh, Louis Logic, Vast Aire, Guilty Simpson, LMNO, Ryu of Styles of Beyond, Breez Evahflowin, Motion Man and Wildchild to name a few. His greatest success came in 2011 with the release of Super, his Super NES-themed release.

Discography 

Albums

 2009: Kick, Punch, Fight, Rhyme
 2009: 12.31.99
 2010: Serial Port Experiments w/ The Digital Fiend
 2011: Super

EPs

 2007: iGod
 2008: Black
 2008: <3:lessthanthree
 2008: Electric Kool-Aid Acid Test
 2008: A Hand-Made Soul
 2008: The Apollo Creed Episodes
 2008: The Apex of Excitement
 2008: Apologies for None
 2009: The Central Parking Lot Rangers
 2009: Ain't Dead Yet
 2009: August Plush
 2009: Ex Nihilo
 2009: 12.30.99
 2010: 12.30.99 Black
 2010: AlphaBetaC-EP
 2010: Perfect Blue
 2010: Half Past Midnight
 2011: The Moments That Unfold Before Me in Life
 2011: Chase the Dragon w/ The Digital Fiend
 2011: <3: Lessthanthree Volume 2 - Elevation from the Endless Void of Manufactured Insanity
 2011: Super
 2012: Magnificent Blitzkrieg w/ magOwl
 2012: Dracula Baby and Other Pimp Tales w/ Vinyl Pimp Cobras
 2012: Air Christ
 2013: Neber Pills w/ Digital Fiend
 2019: Mostly Ill but Sometimes Sick w/ Dirt E. Dutch

Singles

 2007: Rokkonorrottenhell
 2007: The Forsaken 2.0
 2008: Electric Kool-Aid Acid Test
 2008: Morgan Freeman
 2009: Subconscious Tales of Dream Kids in Utero
 2009: The Central Parking Lot Rangers
 2009: WTF!!!
 2009: 1-800-Be-Atari
 2009: Blood Coffee
 2009: New Rose Wilts
 2009: Flawed Human Interactions
 2009: Damnation Alley
 2010: The Hatred to Be
 2010: Outta Time
 2010: The Maturation of Nothingness (Produced by Daedelus)
 2011: Flash the Blitz
 2011: Yellow
 2011: Super
 2012: The Chill
 2012: Gowithaflow
 2013: Bigfoot
 2020: Ucantcdaforest w/ Breez Evahflowin & Mr. Lif

 

1980 births
Rappers from Virginia
Living people
Place of birth missing (living people)
Musicians from Maryland
21st-century American rappers